The Trimble-McCrary House is a historic house at 516 Jefferson Street in Lonoke, Arkansas.  It is a two-story wood-frame structure, with a truncated hip roof, an exterior of clapboards and wooden shingles, and a brick foundation.  It has Folk Victorian styling, including a two-story spindlework porch, and fish-scale shingling on parts of its walls.  The house was built about 1885 for Judge Jacob Chapline, a lawyer who was influential in the establishment of Lonoke County, and who served in the state legislature.

The house was listed on the National Register of Historic Places in 2004.

See also
National Register of Historic Places listings in Lonoke County, Arkansas

References

Houses on the National Register of Historic Places in Arkansas
Victorian architecture in Arkansas
Houses completed in 1885
Houses in Lonoke County, Arkansas
National Register of Historic Places in Lonoke County, Arkansas
Buildings and structures in Lonoke, Arkansas